Nikolai Nikolayevich Durnovo (– 27 October 1937) was a Russian linguist. He was sentenced to death and shot during the Great Purge.

Biography
Durnovo was born into the Durnovo family. His father was also named Nikolai Nikolayevich Durnovo, and his mother was a member of the noble House of Saltykov.

Durnovo was a member of the USSR Academy of Sciences (1924) and the Belarusian Academy of Sciences and specialised in Russian language dialectology, the history of Russian and Slavic languages, Russian language morphology theory of grammar, as well as ancient literature. He created a classification of Russian dialects that served as a base for modern scientific linguistic nomenclature.

During the Great Purge, Durnovo was shot and buried in a mass grave at Sandarmokh in Karelia (northwest Russia).

References

1876 births
1937 deaths
Linguists from the Russian Empire
Great Purge victims from Russia
Writers from Moscow
Nikolay Nikolayevich
Linguists from the Soviet Union
Russian people executed by the Soviet Union
Imperial Moscow University alumni